Tetyana Heorhiyivna Bilenko, née Sorochynska (born 23 November 1983 in Kharkiv) is a Ukrainian table tennis player who has competed at three Olympics.

She competed at the 2008 Summer Olympics, reaching the first round of the singles competition. She also competed at the 2012 Summer Olympics with the same result. Since 2013, Bilenko practices at the Werner Schlager Academy in Schwechat, Austria and plays for WSA-partner club SVNÖ Ströck. She competed at the 2016 Summer Olympics in Rio de Janeiro.

References

1983 births
Living people
Ukrainian female table tennis players
Table tennis players at the 2008 Summer Olympics
Table tennis players at the 2012 Summer Olympics
Table tennis players at the 2016 Summer Olympics
Olympic table tennis players of Ukraine
National University of Kharkiv alumni
Table tennis players at the 2015 European Games
European Games competitors for Ukraine
Sportspeople from Kharkiv